[[File:Limnia unguicornis (Wollenberg).ogv|thumb|Limnia sp. on a blade of grass (video, 34s)]]

The family Sciomyzidae belongs to the typical flies (Brachycera) of the order Diptera. They are commonly called marsh flies, and in some cases snail-killing flies due to the food of their larvae.

Here, the Huttoninidae, Phaeomyiidae and Tetanoceridae are provisionally included in the Sciomyzidae. Particularly the latter seem to be an unequivocal part of this group and are ranked as tribe of subfamily Sciomyzinae by most modern authors, while the former two are very small lineages that may or may not stand outside the family and are provisionally ranked as subfamilies here. Whether the Salticellinae and the group around Sepedon warrant recognition as additional subfamilies or are better included in the Sciomyzinae proper is likewise not yet entirely clear. Altogether, the main point of contention is the relationship between the "Huttoninidae", "Phaeomyiidae", Sciomyzidae sensu stricto, and the Helosciomyzidae which were also once included in the Sciomyzidae.

Sciomyzidae are found in all the biogeographic realms but are poorly represented in the Australasian and Oceanian realms.

Description
For terms see Morphology of Diptera.
Sciomyzidae are small or medium-sized (2–14 mm), usually slender flies with predominantly dull grey, brown, reddish or yellow body, rarely black-lustrous. Wings hyaline, often with dark spots or dark reticulate pattern. The head is semispherical or round. The antennae are usually elongate and the arista is pubescent or has shorter or longer hairs. Ocelli and ocellar bristles are present (absent in Sepedon). The postvertical bristles are divergent or parallel. There are one or two pairs of frontal bristles which curve backward (the lower pair sometimes curving inward) Interfrontal bristles are absent but interfrontal setulae are sometimes present. Vibrissae are absent. The wing is clear or with conspicuous markings. The costa is continuous and the subcosta is complete. Crossvein BM-Cu is present and the anal cell (cell cup) is closed. Tibiae almost always have a  dorsal preapical bristle.

Biology
Marsh flies are common along the edges of ponds and rivers, and in marshy areas. The adults drink dew and nectar. The larvae prey on or become parasites of gastropods (slugs and snails). The occasional sciomyzid attacks snail eggs or fingernail clams. Very little is known about the complete life cycle of these flies but most of the known larvae are semi-aquatic and some are aquatic. Other species have terrestrial larvae. Larvae mainly prey on non-operculate snails. Some species which prey on bivalves have larvae adapted to breathing under water. In some terrestrial species the penultimate larval instar emerges from the snail or slug it developed in. The last instar is then predatory on several snails.

The adults rest on vegetation head down. According to the larval habitat, they are found near water, in marshy vegetation, in woodland or occasionally dry open habitats.

Identification
Stackelberg, A.A. Family Sciomyzidae in  Bei-Bienko, G. Ya, 1988 Keys to the insects of the European Part of the USSR Volume 5 (Diptera) Part 2 English edition. Keys to Palaearctic species but now needs revision.
Séguy, E. (1934) Diptères: Brachycères. II. Muscidae acalypterae, Scatophagidae. Paris: Éditions Faune de France 28. virtuelle numérique

Selected genera

Subfamily Sciomyzinae (possibly polyphyletic)
Tribe SciomyziniApteromicra Atrichomelina Calliscia Colobaea Ditaeniella Neuzina Oidematops Parectinocera Pherbellia Pseudomelina Psacadina Pteromicra Sciomyza Tetanura 
Tribe TetanoceriniAnticheta Chasmacryptum Coremacera Dichetophora Dictya Dictyacium Dictyodes Ectinocera Elgiva Ethiolimnia Eulimnia Euthycera Euthycerina Eutrichomelina Guatemalia Hedria Hoplodictya Hydromya Ilione Limnia 
"Neodictya" Neolimnia Oligolimnia Perilimnia Pherbecta Pherbina Poecilographa Protodictya Psacadina Renocera Sepedomerus Sepedon Sepedonea Sepedonella Sepedoninus Shannonia Steyskalina Tetanocera Tetanoceroides Tetanoptera Teutoniomyia Thecomyia Trypetolimnia Trypetoptera Verbekaria 
Subfamily Huttonininae (tentatively placed here)
 Huttonina 
 Prosochaeta 
Subfamily Phaeomyiinae (tentatively placed here)Akebono Pelidnoptera 
† Prophaeomyia 
Subfamily Salticellinae (sometimes included in Sciomyzinae)
 † Prosalticella 
 Salticella 

Species Lists
West Palaearctic including Russia
 Australasian/Oceanian
Nearctic
Japan
World list

References

Further reading
Rozkošný, R., 1984 The Sciomyzidae (Diptera) of Fennoscandia and Denmark. Fauna Entomologica Scandinavica, 14    Hardback (224 pp., 639 figures, in English)
Lloyd Vernon Knutson  and Jean-Claude Vala, 2011Biology of Snail-Killing Sciomyzidae Flies'' Cambridge University Press

External links

Family Sciomyzidae at EOL
Delta: Family description and images
The Marsh Flies of California
Marsh fly (Tetanocera sp) diagnostic photographs, male and female specimens, in copulo
Images of Sciomyzidae from Diptera.info
Images of Sciomyzidae from Bug Guide

 
Brachycera families
Articles containing video clips
Taxa named by Pierre-Justin-Marie Macquart